Timeline of the COVID-19 pandemic in New Zealand may refer to:

 Timeline of the COVID-19 pandemic in New Zealand (2020)
 Timeline of the COVID-19 pandemic in New Zealand (2021)
 Timeline of the COVID-19 pandemic in New Zealand (2022)
 Timeline of the COVID-19 pandemic in New Zealand (2023)

 
New Zealand